Dejan Glavica (born 20 August 1991) is a Croatian football midfielder who plays for Polet Sveti Martin na Muri on loan from NK Varaždin.

Club career
Glavica came up through the NK Varteks youth academy, making his senior debut with the club's top level Prava HNL squad in 2009. The club changed its name to NK Varaždin in mid-2010. In 2011, during the 2011 Europa League Qualification Round Glavica scored an important first-leg goal against Andorran team Lusitanos. Varaždin would go on to win the game 5–1. In August 2011 he was able to terminate his contract with the financially troubled Varaždin, as they had not paid him his wages, and signed for NK Slaven Belupo.

In 2015, he signed for SV Horn in the Erste Liga.

When NK Varaždin was suspended in 2011 for financial reasons, an unassociated NK Varteks club was founded by disgruntled fans. In 2012, another NK Varaždin was founded in the city, using the name Varaždin ŠN; when the original NK Varaždin went bankrupt and folded in 2015, the Varaždin ŠN team picked up the discarded NK Varaždin name. Glavica, who started his career with the original NK Varteks / NK Varaždin organization, later played for both teams that carry the previous namesthe new NK Varteks in 2016–2017, and the new NK Varaždin in 2017. Glavica is the only player to have taken the field for all variations of  "NK Varteks / NK Varaždin", "NK Varteks" (of 2011) and "NK Varaždin" (of 2012).

References

External links
 
 
 Austrian career stats - ÖFB

1991 births
Living people
Sportspeople from Varaždin
Association football midfielders
Croatian footballers
Croatia youth international footballers
Croatia under-21 international footballers
NK Varaždin players
NK Slaven Belupo players
SV Horn players
NK Zavrč players
HNK Cibalia players
NK Varaždin (2012) players
Croatian Football League players
2. Liga (Austria) players
Slovenian PrvaLiga players
First Football League (Croatia) players
Croatian expatriate footballers
Expatriate footballers in Austria
Croatian expatriate sportspeople in Austria
Expatriate footballers in Slovenia
Croatian expatriate sportspeople in Slovenia